Russie.NEI.Visions (RNV )is an online collection of policy papers each in French, English and Russian produced by the Russia/New Independent States Centre of the French Institute of International Relations (Institut français des relations internationales, Ifri), a think tank. The collection promotes the publication of policy oriented analyses of events in the post-Soviet space, authored by established experts and up-and-coming analysts.

Created in 2005 by Thomas Gomart, today the collection is directed by Tatiana Kastueva-Jean with Maxime Audinet (co-editor), Anne Souin (co-editor) and Florian Vidal (co-editor). Since its creation, a paper collecting the year's production has been published annually.

The collection offers regular analysis of events in the former Soviet states, peer-reviewed and translated into all three languages. The collection has been cited in academic works as well as in the media.

RNV Publications 
 No.119, July 2020, Russia and Latin America: A Difficult Rapprochement, Andrey Pyatakov
 No.118, June 2020, Transformation of Russian Strategic Culture: Impacts from Local Wars and Global Confrontation, Pavel Baev
 No.117, March 2020, Russia’s Arctic Policy: A Power Strategy and Its Limits, Marlène Laruelle
 No.116, October 2019, Friends in Need: Whither the Russia-India Strategic Partnership?, Aleksei Zakharov
 No.115, August 2019, Russian Nuclear Modernization and Putin’s Wonder-Missiles: Real Issues and False Posturing, Pavel Baev
 No.114, April 2019, Russia’s "Great Return" to Africa?, Arnaud Kalika
 No.113, April 2019, Russia’s Militia Groups and their Use at Home and Abroad, Marlène Laruelle
 No.112, December 2018, China’s Ambitions in Eastern Europe and the South Caucasus, Nadège Rolland
 No.111, October 2018, Northern Europe’s Strategic Challenge from Russia: What Political and Military Responses?, Barbara Kunz
 No.110, August 2018, Moldova between Russia and the West: Internal Divisions behind the Commitment to European Integration, Ernest Vardanean
 No.109, July 2018, Moscow’s Syria Campaign: Russian Lessons for the Art of Strategy, Dima Adamsky
 No.108, June 2018, Chutzpah and Realism: Vladimir Putin and the Making of Russian Foreign Policy, Bobo Lo
 No.107, April 2018, From Chechnya to Syria: The Evolution of Russia’s Counter-Terrorist Policy, Pavel Baev
 No.106, March 2018, Putinism: A Praetorian System?, Jean-Robert Raviot
 No.105, December 2017, Russian Spetsnaz, Contractors and Volunteers in the Syrian Conflict, Sarah Fainberg
 No.104, October 2017, Japan-Russia: The Limits of a Strategic Rapprochement, Céline Pajon
 No.103, July 2017, “Russian World”: Russia’s Policy towards its Diaspora, Mikhail Suslov
 No.102, June 2017, Minsk-Beijing: What Kind of Strategic Partnership?, Anaïs Marin
 No.101, May 2017, Reforming Ukrainian Defense: No Shortage of Challenges, Isabelle Facon
 No.100, April 2017, New Order for Old Triangles? The Russia-China-India Matrix, Bobo Lo
 No.99, March 2017, Kadyrovism: Hardline Islam as a Tool of the Kremlin?, Marlène Laruelle
 No.98, February 2017, Central Asia: Facing Radical Islam, Erlan Karin
 No.97, November 2016, Russia and Central and Eastern Europe: between Confrontation and Collusion, Pavel Baev
 No.96, September 2016, Russia's Economic Modernization: The Causes of a Failure, Vladislav Inozemtsev
 No.95, July 2016, The Far Right in the Conflict between Russia and Ukraine, Vyacheslav Likhachev
 No.94, June 2016, Russia’s Asia Strategy: Bolstering the Eagle’s Eastern Wing, Dmitri Trenin
 No.93, May 2016, Russia's Diplomacy in the Middle East: Back to Geopolitics, Alexander Shumilin
 No.92, March 2016, The Illusion of Convergence: Russia, China, and the BRICS, Bobo Lo
 No.91, January 2016, Russia’s Immigration Policy: New Challenges and Tools, Lyubov Bisson
 No.90, December 2015, "Conservatism" in Russia: Political Tool or Historical Choice?, Leonid Polyakov
 No.89, December 2015, Eurasia in Russian Foreign Policy: Interests, Opportunities and Constraints, Ivan Timofeev, Elena Alekseenkova
 No.88, November 2015, Russia: Business and State, Igor Bunin, Alexey Makarkin
 No.87, August 2015, Leaving to Come Back: Russian Senior Officials and the State-Owned Companies, Mikhail Korostikov
 No.86, July 2015, Russia's New Energy Alliances: Mythology versus Reality, Vladimir Milov
 No.85, June 2015, The Kurds: A Channel of Russian Influence in the Middle East?, Igor Delanoë
 No.84, April 2015, Russia's Domestic Evolution, what Impact on its Foreign Policy, Tatiana Kastueva-Jean
 No.83, March 2015, The Jewish Diaspora and the Russo-Ukrainian Crisis, Olena Bagno-Moldavsky
 No.82, January 2015, Frontiers New and Old: Russia’s Policy in Central Asia, Bobo Lo
 No.81, November 2014, Moldova's National Minorities: Why are they Euroskeptical?, Marcin  Koscienkowski & William Schreiber
 No.80, September 2014, Russia and Global Climate Governance, Nina Tynkkynen
 No.79, August 2014, "Green Economy": Opportunities and Constraints for Russian Companies, Pyotr Kiryushin
 No.78, June 2014, The Crisis in Ukraine: An Insider's View, Oleg Grytsaienko
 No.77, May 2014, Russia's Academy of Sciences' Reform: Causes and Consequences for Russian Science, Irina Dezhina
 No.76, April 2014, Russia: Youth and Politics, Mikhail Korostikov
 No.75, March 2014, Rosneft, Gazprom and the Government: the Decision-Making Triangle on Russia's Energy Policy, Pavel Baev
 No.74, February 2014, The EU, Russia and the Eastern Partnership: What Dynamics under the New German Government?, Dominik Tolksdorf
 No.73, December 2013, The Influence of the State on Expanding Russian MNEs: Advantage or Handicap?, Andrei Panibratov
 No.72, September 2013, Japan-Russia: Toward a Strategic Partnership?, Céline Pajon
 No.71, May 2013, Afghanistan after 2014: The Way Forward for Russia, Ekaterina Stepanova
 No.70, April 2013, Russia's Eastern Energy Policy: A Chinese Puzzle for Rosneft, Nina Poussenkova
 No.69, March 2013, Russia-Turkey: A Relationship Shaped by Energy, Rémi Bourgeot
 No.68, February 2013, Governors, Oligarchs, and Siloviki: Oil and Power in Russia, Ahmed Mehdi & Shamil Yenikeyeff
 No.67, January 2013, Deja Vu with BMD: The Improbability of Russia-NATO Missile Defense, Richard Weitz
 No.66, October 2012, The WTO and the Customs Union: What Consequences for the Russian Banking Sector?, Dmitri Miroshnichenko
 No.65, August 2012, Russia's Arctic Policy and the Northern Fleet Modernization, Pavel Baev
 No.64, February 2012, Decoding Russia's WTO Accession, Dominic Fean
 No.63, December 2011, Russian Digital Dualism: Changing Society, Manipulative State, Alexey Sidorenko
 No.62, September 2011, Italy, Russia's Voice in Europe?, Nadezhda Arbatova
 No.61, July 2011, What the North Caucasus Means to Russia, Aleksey Malashenko
 No.60, July 2011, The Caucasus: a Hotbed of Terrorism in Metamorphosis, Pavel Baev
 No.59, April 2011, "Digital Kremlin": Power and the Internet in Russia, Julien Nocetti
 No.58, March 2011, Doing Business in Russia: Informal Practices and Anti-Corruption Strategies, Alena Ledeneva & Stanislav Shekshina
 No.57, February 2011, Developing Research in Russian Universities, Irina Dezhina
 No.56, December 2010, Israel's Immigrant Parties: An Inefficient Russia Lobby, Olena Bagno & Zvi Magen
 No.55, November 2010, Syria: Russia's Best Asset in the Middle East, Andrej Kreutz
 No.54, August 2010, Russia's Far East Policy: Looking Beyond China, Stephen Blank
 No.53, July 2010, Results of the 'Reset' in US-Russian Relations, R. Craig Nation
 No.52, June 2010, From Moscow to Mecca: Russia's Saudi Arabian Diplomacy, Julien Nocetti
 No.51, May 2010, Russia and Turkey: Rethinking Europe to Contest Outsider Status, Richard Sakwa
 No.50, May 2010, Europe in Russian Foreign Policy: Important but no longer Pivotal, Thomas Gomart
 No.49, April 2010, Russia's Greater Middle East Policy: Securing Economic Interests, Courting Islam, Mark N. Katz
 No.48, March 2010, Internal and External Impact of Russia's Economic Crisis, Jeffrey Mankoff
 No.47, February 2010, Russia, China and the United States: From Strategic Triangularism to the Postmodern Triangle, Bobo Lo
 No.46, January 2010, Georgia, Obama, the Economic Crisis: Shifting Ground in Russia-EU Relations, Timofei Bordachev
 No.45, December 2009, What Is China To Us ? Westernizers and Sinophiles in Russian Foreign Policy, Andrei Tsygankov
 No.44, September 2009, Making Good Use of the EU in Georgia : « Eastern Partnership and Conflict Policy », Dominic Fean
 No.43, August 2009, Russia and the “Eastern Partnership” after the War in Georgia, Jean-Philippe Tardieu
 No.42, July 2009, “Cool Neighbors” : Sweden’s EU Presidency and Russia, Eva Hagström Frisell, Ingmar Oldberg
 No.41, June 2009, The Challenges of Russia’s Demographic Crisis, Anatoly Vichnevsky
 No.40, May 2009, NATO and Russia : Post-Georgia Threat Perceptions, Aurel Braun
 No.39, April 2009, Obama and Russia : Facing the Heritage of the Bush Years, Thomas Gomart
 No.38, April 2009, Russia in Latin America : Geopolitical Games in the US’s Neighborhood, Stephen Blank
 No.37, March 2009, Russia’s Armed Forces : The Power of Illusion, Roger McDermott
 No.36, January 2009, China as an Emerging Donor in Tajikistan and Kyrgyzstan, Nargis Kassenova
 No.35, December 2008, Islamist Terrorism in Greater Central Asia : The “Al-Qaedaization” of Uzbek Jihadism, Didier Chaudet
 No.34, September 2008, Russian Chinese Relations through the Lens of the SCO, Stephen Aris
 No.33, August 2008, Academic Cooperation between Russia and the US. Moving Beyond Technical Aid ?, Andrey Kortunov
 No.32, July 2008, Injecting More Differentiation in European Neighbourhood Policy : What Consequences for Ukraine ?, Kerry Longhurst
 No.31, June 2008, Caspian Pipeline Consortium, Bellwether of Russia’s Investment Climate ?, Adrian Dellecker
 No.30, April 2008, The Impact of "New Public Management" on Russian Higher Education, Carole Sigman
 No.29, April 2008, Higher Education in Russia: How to Overcome the Soviet Heritage ?, Boris Saltykov
 No.28, April 2008, Higher Education, the Key to Russia's Competitiveness, Tatiana Kastueva-Jean
 No.27, February 2008, Armenia, a Russian Outpost in the Caucasus ?, Gaïdz Minassian
 No.26, February 2008, EU Gas Liberalization as a Driver of Gazprom's Strategies ?, Catherine Locatelli
 No.25, December 2007, High Stakes in the High North. Russian-Norwegian Relations and their Implication for the EU, Jakub M. Godzimirski
 No.24, November 2007, Russia and the "Gas-OPEC". Real or Perceived Threat?, Dominique Finon
 No.23, October 2007, Paris and the EU-Russia Dialogue: A New Impulse with Nicolas Sarkozy ?, Thomas Gomart
 No.22, September 2007, Rosoboronexport, Spearhead of the Russian Arms Industry, Louis-Marie Clouet
 No.21, July 2007, Russia and the Deadlock over Kosovo, Oksana Antonenko
 No.20, June 2007, Russie-EU beyond 2007. Russian Domestic Debates, Nadezhda Arbatova
 No.19, May 2007, The Opacity of Russian-Ukrainian Energy Relations, Arnaud Dubien
 No.18, March 2007, Gazprom as a Predictable Partner. Another Reading of the Russian-Ukrainian and Russian-Belarusian Energy Crises, Jérôme Guillet
 No.17, March 2007, Gazprom, the Fastest Way to Energy Suicide, Christophe-Alexandre Paillard
 No.16, February 2007, Russia and the WTO: On the Finishing Stretch, Julien Vercueil
 No.15, January 2007, Russia and the Council of Europe: Ten Years Wasted ?, Jean-Pierre Massias
 No.14, September 2006, The "Greatness and Misery" of Higher Education in Russia, Tatiana Kastueva-Jean
 No.13, September 2006, The EU-Russia Energy Dialogue: Competition Versus Monopolies, Vladimir Milov
 No.12, July 2006, The Shanghai Cooperation Organization as "Geopolitical Bluff?" A View from Astana, Murat Laumulin
 No.11, June 2006, Abkhazia and South Ossetia: Collision of Georgian and Russian Interests, Tracey German
 No.10, May 2006, Special Issue : Workshop on EU-Russia relations

"Russia, NATO and the EU: A European Security Triangle or Shades of a New Entente ?", Andrew Monaghan

"The EU and Russia: the Needed Balance Between Geopolitics and Regionalism", Thomas Gomart

"Representing Private Interests to Increase Trust in Russia-EU Relations", Timofei Bordachev

"Multiplying Sources as the Best Strategy for EU-Russia Energy Relations", Michael Thumann

 No.9, March 2006, Ukraine's Scissors: between Internal Weakness and External Dependence, James Sherr
 No.8, January 2006, Russia and Turkey in the Caucasus: Moving Together to Preserve the Status Quo ?, Fiona Hill and Omer Taspinar
 No.7, October 2005, UE Crisis: What Opportunities for Russia ?, Timofei Bordachev
 No.6 (a), September 2005 "Russia and Germany: Continuity and Changes", Andrei Zagorski
 No.6(b), September 2005, "Germany's Policy on Russia: End of the Honeymoon?", Hannes Adomeit
 No.5, August 2005, From Plans to Substance: EU-Russia Relations During the British Presidency, Andrew Monaghan
 No.4, June 2005, Russian Scientists: Where Are they? Where Are They Going? Human Resources and Research Policy in Russia, Irina Dezhina
 No.3, May 2005, Re-Writing Russia's Subsoil Law: from Sovereignty to Civil Law ?, William Tompson
 No.2, April 2005, Shared Neighbourhood or New Frontline ? The Crossroads in Moldova, Dov Lynch
 No.1, April 2005, A Fine Balance - The Strange Case of Sino-Russian Relations, Bobo Lo

Russie.Nei.Reports 

Launched in September 2009, Russie.Nei.Reports is an electronic collection providing extensive analysis based on fieldwork. Papers are published either in French or in English.
 No. 32, August 2020 : Un régime dans la tourmente : le système de sécurité intérieure et extérieure du Bélarus, Andrey Paratnikau (Porotnikov)
 No. 31, June 2020 : Mémoire de la Seconde Guerre mondiale dans la Russie actuelle, Tatiana Kastouéva-Jean, (dir.), Olga Konkka, Nikolaï Koposov, Emilia Koustova, Denis Volkov, Tatiana Zhurzhenko
 No. 30, May 2020 : Quand la guerre s’invite à l’école : la militarisation de l’enseignement en Russie, Olga Konkka
 No. 29, March 2020 : The Return: Russia and the Security Landscape of Northeast Asia, Bobo Lo
 No. 28, December 2019 : Russia’s Energy Strategy-2035: Struggling to Remain Relevant, Tatiana Mitrova, Vitaly Yermakov
 No. 27, July 2019 : Greater Eurasia: The Emperor’s New Clothes or an Idea whose Time Has Come?, Bobo Lo
 No. 26, March 2019 : Russia's Relations with South-East Asia, Dmitry Gorenburg & Paul Schwartz
 No. 25, February 2019 : Kremlin-Linked Forces in Ukraine's 2019 Elections: On the Brink of Revenge?, Vladislav Inozemtsev
 No. 24, September 2018 : Making Sense of Russia's Policy in Afghanistan, Stephen Blank & Younkyoo Kim
 No. 23, May 2018 : Russia’s Afghan Policy in the Regional and Russia-West Contexts, Ekaterina Stepanova
 No. 22, February 2018 : Russo-British Relations in the Age of Brexit, Richard Sakwa
 No. 21, October 2015 : There Will Be Gas: Gazprom's Transport Strategy in Europe, Aurélie Bros
 No. 20, September 2015 : Guerre de l'information : le web russe dans le conflit en Ukraine, Julien Nocetti
 No. 19, May 2015 : Ukraine: a Test for Russian Military Reforms, Pavel Baev
 No. 18, July 2014 : Gazprom in Europe: a Business Doomed to Fail?, Aurélie Bros
 No. 17, January 2014 : Russia's Eastern Direction—Distinguishing the Real from the Virtual, Bobo Lo
 No. 16, December 2013 : Russian LNG: The Long Road to Export, Tatiana Mitrova
 No. 15, December 2012 : OMC: quel impact pour le secteur agricole russe ?, Pascal Grouiez
 No. 14, November 2012 : Kazakhstan and Eurasian Economic Integration: Quick Start, Mixed Results and Uncertain Future, Nargis Kassenova
 No. 13, October 2012 : Entreprises et universités russes : de la coopération au recrutement, Tatiana Kastouéva-Jean
 No. 12, June 2012 : The Religious Diplomacy of the Russian Federation, Alicja Curanovic
 No. 11, April 2012 : Ukraine at the Crossroads: Between the EU DCFTA and Customs Union, Olga Shumylo-Tapiola
 No. 10, March 2012 : Le Web en Russie : de la virtualité à la réalité politique ?, Julien Nocetti
 No. 9, January 2012 : Université fédérale de l'Oural, une futur "Harvard régionale"?, Tatiana Kastouéva-Jean
 No. 8, June 2011 : L'université Goubkine: réservoir de cadres pour le secteur pétrolier et gazier, Tatiana Kastouéva-Jean
 No. 7, May 2011 : Economic Constraint and Ukraine's Security Policy, Dominic Fean
 No. 6, December 2010 : How the Chinese See Russia, Bobo Lo
 No. 5, October 2010 : "Soft power" russe: discours, outils, impact, Tatiana Kastouéva-Jean
 No. 4, September 2010 : Les universités privées, "mal-aimées" de l'enseignement supérieur russe, Tatiana Kastouéva-Jean
 No. 3, March 2010 : L'université technique Bauman: un atout majeur de la politique industrielle russe, Carole Sigman
 No. 2, October 2009 : Le Haut collège d'économie: école de commerce, université et think tank, Carole Sigman
 No. 1, October 2009 : "Projet MISiS": futur modèle de l'enseignement supérieur en Russie?, Tatiana Kastouéva-Jean

See also
 Foreign relations of Russia
 Gazprom
 Thomas Gomart

Energy policy
Foreign relations of Russia
2005 works